George van Rossem (30 May 1882 – 14 January 1955) was a Dutch fencer. He won a silver and three bronze medals. He was the President of the Fédération Internationale d'Escrime from 1925 to 1928. He was the secretary general of the executive committee of the Netherlands Olympic Committee (Committee 1928) which organized the 1928 Summer Olympics in Amsterdam.

References

External links
 

1882 births
1955 deaths
Dutch male épée fencers
Olympic fencers of the Netherlands
Olympic silver medalists for the Netherlands
Olympic bronze medalists for the Netherlands
Olympic medalists in fencing
Medalists at the 1906 Intercalated Games
Medalists at the 1912 Summer Olympics
Fencers at the 1906 Intercalated Games
Fencers at the 1908 Summer Olympics
Fencers at the 1912 Summer Olympics
Fencers at the 1920 Summer Olympics
Sportspeople from The Hague
Dutch male sabre fencers
20th-century Dutch people